60 Armoured Regiment is an armoured regiment of the Indian Army.

History

The regiment was raised in 2019 at Ahmednagar. It is equipped with the T-90 tanks and is currently part of the Jhansi based  31 Armoured Division (White Tiger Division).

References
	

Armoured and cavalry regiments of the Indian Army from 1947
Military units and formations established in 2019